Miss Supranational 2019 was the 11th Miss Supranational pageant. It was held on December 6, 2019, at the International Congress Centre in Katowice, Poland. Valeria Vázquez of Puerto Rico crowned Anntonia Porsild of Thailand at the end of the event.

Contestants from 77 countries and territories participated in the competition.

This edition has the most number of contestants in the history of Miss Supranational.

Background
 
On September 12, 2019, Gerhard Parzutka von Lipinski, President of the Miss Supranational Organization, announced that the 2019 Miss Supranational Competition pageant would be held on December 6, 2019, in International Congress Center (MCK), Katowice, Silesia, Poland the competition's venue for the first year. The International Congress Centre was established in the heart of the Culture Zone, in a new and revitalized space near the iconic Spodek and other unique buildings such as the seat of the Polish National Radio Symphony Orchestra and the Silesian Museum.

Results

Placements

Continental Queens of Beauty

Order of announcements

Top 25

Top 10

Top 5

Special awards

Supra Model of the Year

Contestants
77 contestants competed for the title.

Notes

Debuts

Returns
Last competed in 2013:
 
 
 
 
 

Last competed in 2015:
 
 
 
 

Last competed in 2016:
 
 
 

Last competed in 2017:

Withdrawals

Crossovers 
Contestants who previously competed or will be competing at other international beauty pageants:
Miss Universe
 2020: : Vivii Altonen (Unplaced)
 2020: : Janick Maceta (2nd runner-up)
 2020: : Angèle Kossinda (Unplaced)
 2022: : Alba Isabel Obama (TBA)
 2022: : Nguyễn Thị Ngọc Châu (TBA)
Miss World
 2015: : Sheryna Van Der Koelen (as )
 2017: : Avril Marco (Top 40)
Miss International
 2014: : Mercy Mukwiza
 2017: : Nathalie Mogbelzada
 2018: : María Elena Antelo
Miss Earth
 2015: : Eaint Myat Chal
 2017: : Angèle Kossinda (Top 16)
Miss Grand International
 2021: : Nathalie Mogbelzada (Top 20)
 2018: : Jurate Stasiunaite
Miss Eco International
 2018: : Carolina Liquito (Top 16)
 2018: : Jessica VanGaalen (as )
Miss Landscapes International
 2019: : Esther Yeanoh Kamara  (Top 7)
Miss Tourism Queen International
 2015: : Nathalie Mogbelzada  (Winner)
Miss Tourism World
 2018: : Janick Maceta (1st Runner-Up)
World Miss Tourism Ambassador
 2017: : Eva Louise Wilson
 2018: : María Elena Antelo (2nd Runner-Up)
Miss Supermodel Worldwide
 2019: : Wasana Gunasekara (3rd Runner-Up)
Supermodel International
 2019: : Viivi Altonen (3rd Runner-Up)
Reina Intercontinental
 2015: : Katherine Masi Zárate  (Winner)
Miss Continentes Unidos (Miss United Continents)
 2018: : Jessica VanGaalen (as )

References

External links 
 

2019
2019 beauty pageants